Stegocephalidae is a little-studied family of amphipods belonging to the suborder Gammaridea.

Description
Stegocephalids have smooth and globular bodies with a short and deep head. It has small rostrum and the highly modified mouthparts are arranged into a cone structure. the functions of which are unknown but believed to be either for sucking or piercing. The upper part of the lips has a small notch on the distal side, while the lower lip are tall and lack inner lobes. The mandibular molar and palp may be absent or only present in vestigial forms. On the maxilla, the inner plates are setose and well-developed while the palp is often reduced and consists of only a single segment. The maxillipeds are large, often with an inner cutting edge and slender weakly dactylate palps. The eyes are kidney-shaped when present, but is more often completely absent. The antennae possess short peduncles and flagella, with that on the first pair being somewhat stout with fused flagellar segments near the base. In males the first antennal pair is covered with brushlike setae.

On the first four body segments are four very large, non-overlapping, and deep coxal plates, forming a sort of skirt on the front half of the body. The fourth plates are subovate in shape and are the largest. The gnathopods may are slender and may possess small claws or none at all. The third to seventh pereopods are roughly the same size, with the seventh pair being the shortest. The pleon plates on the sides of the body are deep with strong pleopods. The three uropods possess rami that are about the same size and are lanceolate in shape. Their tips extend past the telson. The telson may be composed of lobes fused at the base and tapering to sharp point; or the lobes may be completely fused together to form a small plate.

Distribution and habitat
Stegocephalids are found worldwide, almost exclusively on deep and cold waters.

Ecology
Most of the members of the family are believed to be bathypelagic and free-floating, inhabiting the oceanic water columns at depths of thousands of meters below the ocean surface. They are commonly found with oil globules just underneath their carapaces. These are believed to function as aids in making the animals more buoyant, allowing them to float in the water with little energy expenditure. The smooth, globular shape of the body helps in streamlining the animal while drifting in the water currents, further aided by the animal retracting all its appendages within its coxal plates. The more pelagic the habits of the species, the more elongated they seem to be.

Some species, however, may primarily be benthic, inhabiting the surface of the ocean floor in association with megabenthic fauna like sponges. This includes Parandaniexis mirabilis which shows evidence of being a primarily benthic micropredator of polychaetes. Their coxal plates are more reduced with more robust peropods adapted to clinging and walking than that of free-floating stegocephalids.

Stegocephalids extend their legs once resting on a substrate. In observations on captive specimens, they do not seem to have the tendency to burrow into the substrate, though this might only be because of the absence of prey in the laboratory substrates.

They are mostly predators of cnidarians, with the exception of the genus Andaniotes which are scavengers.

Taxonomy
Stegocephalidae is the sole member of the superfamily Stegocephaloidea. It includes the following genera and species divided under five subfamilies:

Subfamily Andaniopsinae Berge & Vader, 2001
Genus Andaniopsis Sars, 1895
Andaniopsis africana Berge, Vader & Galan, 2001
Andaniopsis integripes (Bellan-Santini & Ledoyer, 1986)
Andaniopsis isaki Berge, 2004
Andaniopsis nordlandica (Boeck, 1871)
Andaniopsis pectinata (Sars, 1883)
Genus Steleuthera J. L. Barnard, 1964
Steleuthera africana (Berge, Vader & Galan, 2001)
Steleuthera ecoprophycaea Bellan-Santini & Thurston, 1996
Steleuthera maremboca J. L. Barnard, 1964
Subfamily Andaniexinae  Berge & Vader, 2001
Genus Andaniexis Stebbing, 1906
Andaniexis abyssi (Boeck, 1871)
Andaniexis americana Berge, Vader & Galan, 2001
Andaniexis andaniexis Berge & Vader, 2003
Andaniexis australis Barnard, 1932
Andaniexis eilae Berge & Vader, 1997
Andaniexis elinae Berge & Vader, 2003
Andaniexis gloriosae Berge, Vader & Galan, 2001
Andaniexis gracilis Berge & Vader, 1997
Andaniexis lupus Berge & Vader, 1997
Andaniexis mimonectes Ruffo, 1975
Andaniexis oculata Birstein & Vinogradov, 1970
Andaniexis ollii Berge, De Broyer & Vader, 2000
Andaniexis pelagica Berge, Vader & Galan, 2001
Andaniexis spinescens (Alcock, 1894)
Andaniexis stylifer Birstein & M. Vinogradov, 1960
Andaniexis subabyssi Birstein & M. Vinogradov, 1955
Genus Andaniotes Stebbing, 1897
Andaniotes abyssorum Stebbing, 1888
Andaniotes bagabag Lowry & Stoddart, 1995
Andaniotes islandica (Thompson, 1882)
Andaniotes karkar Lowry & Stoddart, 1995
Andaniotes linearis K. H. Barnard, 1932
Andaniotes lowryi Berge, 2001
Andaniotes pooh Berge, 2001
Andaniotes poorei Berge, 2001
Andaniotes pseudolinearis Berge, 2001
Andaniotes wallaroo J. L. Barnard, 1972
Andaniotes wollongong Berge, 2001
Genus Glorandaniotes Ledoyer, 1986
Glorandaniotes eilae (Berge & Vader, 1997)
Glorandaniotes fissicaudata Ledoyer, 1986
Glorandaniotes norae Berge & Vader, 2003
Glorandaniotes sandroi Berge & Vader, 2003
Glorandaniotes spongicola (Pirlot, 1933)
Glorandaniotes traudlae Berge & Vader, 2003
Glorandaniotes vemae Berge & Vader, 2003
Genus Mediterexis Berge & Vader, 2001
Mediterexis macho Berge & Vader, 2004
Mediterexis mimonectes (Ruffo, 1975)
Genus Metandania Stephensen, 1925
Metandania islandica Stephensen, 1925
Metandania tordi Berge & Vader, 2003
Metandania wimi Berge, 2001
Genus Parandaniexis Schellenberg, 1929
Parandaniexis dewitti Watling & Holman, 1980
Parandaniexis inermis Watling & Holman, 1980
Parandaniexis mirabilis Schellenberg, 1929
Parandaniexis pelagica (Berge, Vader & Galan, 2001)
Parandaniexis tridentata Ledoyer, 1986
Genus Stegosoladidus Barnard & Karaman, 1987
Stegosoladidus antarcticus Berge, 2001
Stegosoladidus complex Berge, 2001
Stegosoladidus debroyeri Berge, 2001
Stegosoladidus ingens (Chevreux, 1906e)
Stegosoladidus simplex (K. H. Barnard, 1930) 
Subfamily Bathystegocephalinae Berge & Vader, 2001
Genus Bathystegocephalus Schellenberg, 1926
Bathystegocephalus globosus (Walker, 1909)
Subfamily Parandaniinae Berge & Vader, 2001
Genus Parandania Stebbing, 1899
Parandania boecki (Stebbing, 1888)
Parandania gigantea (Stebbing, 1883)
Parandania nonhiata (Andres, 1985)
Subfamily Stegocephalinae Dana, 1855
Genus Alania Berge & Vader, 2001
Alania beringi (Berge & Vader, 2001)
Alania calypsonis (Berge, Vader & Galan, 2001)
Alania hancocki (Hurley, 1956)
Genus Austrocephaloides Berge & Vader, 2001
Austrocephaloides australis (K. H. Barnard, 1916)
Austrocephaloides boxshalli (Berge, Vader & Galan, 2001)
Austrocephaloides camoti (J. L. Barnard, 1967)
Austrocephaloides gunnae (Berge & Vader, 2003)
Austrocephaloides ingstadi (Berge & Vader, 2003)
Austrocephaloides tori (Berge & Vader, 2003)
Austrocephaloides tucki (Berge & Vader, 2003)
Genus Austrophippsia Berge & Vader, 2001
Austrophippsia unihamata (Berge & Vader, 2000)
Genus Bouscephalus Berge & Vader, 2001
Bouscephalus mamillidacta (Moore, 1992)
Genus Gordania Berge & Vader, 2001
Gordania minima (J. L. Barnard, 1961)
Gordania pajarella (J. L. Barnard, 1967)
Genus Phippsia Stebbing, 1906
Phippsia gibbosa (Sars, 1882)
Phippsia roemeri Schellenberg, 1925
Genus Pseudo Berge & Vader, 2001
Pseudo bioice (Berge & Vader, 1997)
Pseudo pacifica (Bulycheva, 1952)
Pseudo pseudophippsia (Bellan-Santini, 1985)
Pseudo vanhoeffeni (Schellenberg, 1926)
Pseudo viscaina (J. L. Barnard, 1967)
Genus Stegocephalexia Moore, 1992
Stegocephalexia penelope Moore, 1992
Genus Stegocephalina Stephensen, 1925
Stegocephalina barnardi Berge & Vader, 2001
Stegocephalina beringi Berge & Vader, 2001
Stegocephalina biofar Berge & Vader, 1997
Stegocephalina boxshalli Berge, Vader & Galan, 2001
Stegocephalina idae Berge & Vader, 1997
Stegocephalina ingolfi Stephensen, 1925
Stegocephalina pacis (Bellan-Santini & Ledoyer, 1974)
Stegocephalina trymi Berge, 2001
Stegocephalina wagini (Gurjanova, 1936)
Stegocephalina wolf Berge & Vader, 2004
Genus Stegocephaloides Sars, 1895
Stegocephaloides attingens Barnard, 1932
Stegocephaloides auratus (Sars, 1882)
Stegocephaloides australis K. H. Barnard, 1916
Stegocephaloides bernardi Berge & Vader, 1997
Stegocephaloides boxhalli Berge, Vader & Galan, 2001
Stegocephaloides christianiensis Boeck, 1871
Stegocephaloides gunnae Berge & Vader, 2003
Stegocephaloides ingstadi Berge & Vader, 2003
Stegocephaloides ledoyeri Berge, Vader & Galan, 2001
Stegocephaloides tori Berge & Vader, 2003
Stegocephaloides tucki Berge & Vader, 2003
Stegocephaloides wagini (Gurjanova, 1936)
Genus Stegocephalus Krøyer, 1842
Stegocephalus abyssicola (Oldevig, 1959)
Stegocephalus ampulla (Phipps, 1774)
Stegocephalus casadiensis (Moore, 1992)
Stegocephalus inflatus Krøyer, 1842
Stegocephalus kergueleni (Schellenberg, 1926a)
Stegocephalus longicornis (Gurjanova, 1962)
Stegocephalus nipoma (J. L. Barnard, 1961)
Stegocephalus rostrata K. H. Barnard, 1932
Genus Stegomorphia Berge & Vader, 2001
Stegomorphia watlingi (Berge, De Broyer & Vader, 2000)
Genus Stegonomadia Berge & Vader, 2001
Stegonomadia biofar (Berge & Vader, 1997)
Stegonomadia idae (Berge & Vader, 1997)
Stegonomadia katalia (J. L. Barnard, 1962)
Genus Tetradeion Stebbing, 1899
Tetradeion angustipalma (Berge & Vader, 2000)
Tetradeion crassum (Chilton, 1883)
Tetradeion dampieri (Berge & Vader, 2000)
Tetradeion latus (Haswell, 1879)
Tetradeion quatro Berge & Vader, 2000
Subfamily incertae sedis
Genus Glorandantiotes 
Glorandantiotes fissicaudata Ledoyer, 1986

References

Gammaridea
Crustacean families